John Stokeley Fulton (October 24, 1929 – July 13, 1985) was an American college football, baseball, tennis, and wrestling coach for Hampden–Sydney College. He was also the school's head athletic director.

Biography
Born on October 24, 1929 in Brosville, Virginia, John Stokeley Fulton grew up in Danville, Virginia. He attended George Washington High School and went on to the University of Tennessee to play football. After one year, Fulton transferred to Hampden–Sydney College. At Hampden–Sydney, Fulton stood out at both baseball and football – he was captain of both teams by his senior year and was named an all-conference player in football each year that he played. Fulton was also named a Little All-American in 1953.

Fulton was a brother and president of Pi Kappa Alpha, and admitted to Omicron Delta Kappa, the National Honorary Leadership Society. His senior year, Fulton was student body president.

Subsequent to graduating in 1955, Fulton enlisted in the U.S. Coast Guard for two years. By 1957, Fulton returned to Hampden–Sydney where he was hired as a line coach for the Tigers' football team. That year, the Tigers won the conference. His second year working for Hampden–Sydney, Fulton was hired as an assistant for the baseball team. His teams won the conference the two years that he was an assistant baseball coach. Fulton also took over the reins of tennis coach in 1958 and created the first Hampden–Sydney wrestling team in 1959. Fulton's coaching prowess shined quickly in tennis – by 1963 his teams had won 2 conference championships.

In 1967, Stokeley Fulton became head coach of the Tigers' baseball team. As the head of the squad, he won 2 Mason–Dixon Conference championships in 1970 and 1971.

Fulton is best remembered for his coaching dexterity in football. In 1960, he was hired as head football coach – a position he held for the next 25 years. Fulton would go on to win 9 conference championships as the head coach of the Tigers' football team. To this day he is the winningest football head coach at Hampden–Sydney (143–99–5) and the longest tenured head coach with 25 seasons. Fulton's teams went to back-to-back Knute Rockne Bowls in 1970 and 1971, and made the D–III quarterfinals in 1977 following an undefeated regular season.

Fulton brought Tigers' football to national attention in both 1976 and 1980. In 1976, his squad was host to a premier telecast on ABC against the undefeated and number one-ranked James Madison Dukes. The Tigers won the game, snapping the Dukes' 14–game winning streak, and pushing the Tigers to a 3rd overall national ranking. Similarly, in 1980, the Tigers were again host to a nationally televised game on ABC against Salisbury State, in which they lost 28–13.

Fulton was a member of the American Football Coaches Association, served on the NCAA rules committee for baseball, and was the College's Athletic Director from 1971 to 1980. At the time of his retirement, Fulton placed eighth all-time in wins among active Division III coaches. In one of his last official appearances at Hampden–Sydney, coach Fulton was honored at the 1985 College commencement ceremonies, receiving the senior class award and concomitant commendation from commencement speaker Vice President George H. W. Bush.

Death
Fulton ceased coaching midway through the 1985 baseball season at Hampden–Sydney, relinquishing the head coaching duties to his nephew, Frank Fulton. Several months later he succumbed to cancer on July 13, 1985.

Head coaching record

Football

Baseball

Tennis

Notes

References

External links
 

1929 births
1985 deaths
Hampden–Sydney Tigers athletic directors
Hampden–Sydney Tigers baseball coaches
Hampden–Sydney Tigers baseball players
Hampden–Sydney Tigers football coaches
Hampden–Sydney Tigers football players
Hampden–Sydney Tigers wrestling coaches
Tennessee Volunteers football players
Hampden–Sydney Tigers men's tennis coaches
Sportspeople from Danville, Virginia
People from Pittsylvania County, Virginia
Players of American football from Virginia